Madame Bovary is a 1947 Argentine historical drama film directed by Carlos Schlieper and starring Mecha Ortiz, Roberto Escalada and Enrique Diosdado. It is an adaptation of Gustave Flaubert's 1857 novel Madame Bovary.

Plot summary

Cast
 Mecha Ortiz as Ema Bovary  
 Roberto Escalada as León Dupuis  
 Enrique Diosdado as Rodolfo Boulanger  
 Alberto Bello as Carlos Bovary  
 Angelina Pagano as Sra Bovary, mother  
 Ricardo Galache as Gustave Flaubert 
 Graciela Lecube as Felicidad 
 Juan Carlos Altavista as Justino  
 María Esther Podestá as Viuda Lefrancois  
 Alejandro Maximino as Monsieur Homais  
 Max Citelli as Sr. Binet  
 Liana Moabro as Sra. Homais  
 Nélida Romero as Artemisa 
 Jorge Villoldo as Coachman

References

Bibliography 
 Goble, Alan. The Complete Index to Literary Sources in Film. Walter de Gruyter, 1999.

External links 
 
 

1947 films
Argentine historical drama films
Films about infidelity
Argentine black-and-white films
1940s historical drama films
1940s Spanish-language films
Films directed by Carlos Schlieper
Films set in France
Films set in the 19th century
Films based on Madame Bovary
1947 drama films
1940s Argentine films